Hansung High School (Hangeul: 한성고등학교, Hanja: 漢城高等學校) is a boys high school. The founder Ju-yik Kim opened the high school in Seodaemun-gu, 1928.

References

External links
 

High schools in Seoul
Seodaemun District
Private schools in South Korea
Boys' schools in South Korea